Castell Henllys (Welsh, "castle of the old court") is an important archaeological site in north Pembrokeshire, Wales, on the A487 road between Newport and Cardigan, in the parish of Nevern.

The Iron Age hillfort has been the subject of an ongoing excavation for more than twenty years, accompanied by an exercise in reconstruction archaeology whereby experiments in prehistoric farming have been practised.  Four roundhouses and a granary have been reconstructed on their original Iron Age foundations, some 2,000 years old, the only site in Britain where this has been done.

Historic UK say:

During the summer the site provides training for young archaeologists and is a popular visitor attraction. It is owned by Pembrokeshire Coast National Park.

See also
 List of hillforts in Wales
 Butser Ancient Farm
 Weald and Downland Living Museum

References

External links

 Castell Henllys website
 Celtic roundhouses at Castell Henllys
 Castell Henllys at Gathering the Jewels
 Photoraphs of Castell Henllys and surrounding area on Geograph

Hillforts in Pembrokeshire
Museums in Pembrokeshire
Open-air museums in Wales
Prehistoric sites in Pembrokeshire
Experimental archaeology
Archaeological museums in Wales